Abū Dharr al-Harawī, ʿAbd b. Aḥmad b. Muḥammad b. ʿAbd Allāh al-Anṣārī, also known as Abū Dharr al-Harawī was a reputable Maliki hadith specialist (muhaddith) where he spent most of his lifetime in Mecca.

Biography
He was born in Herat and spent his early life there where he studied hadith under prominent scholars of the city. He became the narrator of Sahih Al-Bukhari on the authority of the three: Al-Mustamlei, Al-Hamwi, and Al-Kashmihini. As he got older, he travelled to peruse further knowledge and his most important journey is when he visited Baghdad meeting with the leading scholars. In that city, he met with the famous Al-Baqillani who taught him the Maliki jurisprudence and Ash'ari creed. He studied hadith under the leading hadith scholars such as Al-Khattabi and Al-Daraqutni. He departed from Baghdad to the west and settled in Mecca, where he lived for a while and from there he began authoring books and became a teacher, his famous students include Ibn Manzur who was the main teacher of Ibn Barrajan. He then married into the Arab community and resided in Al-Sarwan. He performed Hajj every year, residing in Makkah during the season, then returning to his family, and he was a trustworthy, religious and virtuous officer.

Works
 Al Mustakhraj al Al'iilzamati ("Extracted on Obligations)
 Muskharij al Alsahihayni ("Extracted on the right")
 Kitab Fi al sunnati Wa sifati ("A book on Sunnah and Attributes")
 Kitab al Jami ("Collector book")
 Kitab al Dua ("Prayer book")
 Kitab Fadhail al Qurani ("The Book of the Virtues of the Qur’an")
 kitab Dalail al Nubuat ("Evidence of prophecy book")
 kitab Shahadat alzuri ("Perjury book")
 Kitab Fadhail Malik ("Malik's virtues book")
 Kitab Fadhail Aleydayni ("The Book of the Virtues of the Two Eids")

References

946 births
1042 deaths
Malikis
Asharis
Hadith scholars